Ferenc Várkõi (27 January 1916 – 12 November 1987) was a Hungarian gymnast, born in Csongrád. He competed in gymnastics events at the 1948 Summer Olympics. He won a bronze medal with the Hungarian team at the 1948 Summer Olympics.

References

External links
 

1916 births
1987 deaths
People from Csongrád
Hungarian male artistic gymnasts
Gymnasts at the 1948 Summer Olympics
Olympic gymnasts of Hungary
Olympic bronze medalists for Hungary
Olympic medalists in gymnastics
Medalists at the 1948 Summer Olympics
Sportspeople from Csongrád-Csanád County
20th-century Hungarian people